Closer is the sixth studio album by American Christian and country music singer Susan Ashton. It was released in 1999 on Capitol Nashville. It was her only disc for the label. It was produced by Emory Gordy Jr. The album contains songs written by Diane Warren, Matraca Berg and Kim Richey. Ashton herself only co-wrote one song here, "Think of Me".

Three singles were released, with the Warren-penned "Faith of the Heart" being first. It peaked at No. 51 on the Hot Country Songs chart in the US, while peaking twenty spots lower in Canada. The second single, "You're Lucky I Love You", fared a bit better reaching No. 37 in the US and No. 52 in Canada. The title track didn't chart. The album itself reached No. 34 on the country charts, while failing to find a footing on the Christian music charts.

"Breathless" was later released as a single by River Road in 2001. Both The Jenkins and Hall & Oates released versions of "Getaway Car". "Supernatural" was later recorded by American country music singer Sara Evans on her 2005 album Real Fine Place.

Reception
AllMusic's Heather Phares called Ashton "an emotive vocalist", and said that Closer "finds Ashton hitting her stride as a performer and singer", giving the album four stars out of five.

Track listing

Personnel 
 Susan Ashton – lead vocals, harmony vocals
 Mike Lawler – keyboards
 John Barlow Jarvis – acoustic piano
 Matt Rollings – acoustic piano
 Phil Madeira – Hammond organ
 Steve Nathan – Hammond organ
 Dann Huff – electric guitars, acoustic guitars
 Steve Gibson – electric guitars, gut-string guitars, bouzouki, mandolin
 Biff Watson – acoustic guitars
 Dan Dugmore – steel guitar
 Paul Franklin – steel guitar
 Sonny Garrish – steel guitar
 Stuart Duncan – fiddle, octave fiddle, mandolin
 Emory Gordy Jr. – bass guitar, string arrangements 
 Steve Brewster – drums, percussion
 Owen Hale – drums, percussion
 Lonnie Wilson – drums, percussion
 Kristin Wilkinson – concertmaster
 Anthony LaMarchina – cello
 Bob Mason – cello
 Monisa Angell – viola
 Jim Grosjean – viola
 Gary Vanosdale – viola
 Connie Heard – violin
 Pamela Sixfin – violin
 Chris Teal – violin
 J.D. Cunningham – backing vocals
 Vince Gill – backing vocals
 Vicki Hampton – backing vocals
 Billy Mann – backing vocals
 Chris Rodriguez – backing vocals
 Harry Stinson – backing vocals
 Neil Thrasher – backing vocals

Production
 Emory Gordy Jr. – producer
 Russ Martin – engineer
 Rob MacMillan – assistant engineer
 John Guess – mixing
 Patrick Murphy – mix assistant
 Glenn Meadows – mastering at Masterfonics (Nashville, Tennessee)
 Virginia Team – art direction
 Chris Ferrara – design 
 Mark Tucker – photography

Chart performance

References 

1999 albums
Capitol Records albums
Susan Ashton albums
Albums produced by Emory Gordy Jr.